Oberea taiwana is a species of beetle in the family Cerambycidae. It was described by Masaki Matsushita in 1933. It is known from Taiwan.

References

Beetles described in 1933
taiwana